Ayabaca District is one of ten districts of the province Ayabaca in Peru.

References